Anthony Wayne Bender (born February 3, 1995) is an American professional baseball pitcher for the Miami Marlins of Major League Baseball (MLB). He was drafted by the Kansas City Royals in the 20th round of the 2016 Major League Baseball draft.

Career

Kansas City Royals
Bender was drafted with 613th pick in the 20th round of the 2016 MLB draft by the Kansas City Royals out of Santa Rosa Junior College. Bender made his professional debut for the Rookie League Arizona League Royals. He split the 2017 season between the Class A Lexington Legends, and the Class A-Advanced Wilmington Blue Rocks, recording a cumulative 5–6 record and 3.96 ERA. He spent the entire 2018 season in Wilmington, recording a 3.57 ERA and 6–3 record in 30 appearances. On March 21, 2019, Bender was released by the Royals.

Milwaukee Brewers
On April 12, 2019, Bender signed with the Sioux City Explorers of the American Association of Independent Professional Baseball. After pitching 3.2 scoreless innings for Sioux City, on May 29, the Milwaukee Brewers signed him to a minor league contract. Bender played for the Single-A Wisconsin Timber Rattlers, the High-A Carolina Mudcats, and the Double-A Biloxi Shuckers, accumulating a 1.49 ERA in 29 appearances. After the minor league season was cancelled in 2020 because of the COVID-19 pandemic, Bender joined the Milwaukee Milkmen of the American Association for the 2020 season. Bender pitched to a 5.48 ERA with 25 strikeouts with the Milkmen in 2020, and won the American Association championship with the club. On November 2, 2020, Bender elected free agency.

Miami Marlins
On November 30, 2020, Bender signed a minor league contract with the Miami Marlins organization. On May 4, 2021, Bender was selected to the 40-man roster and promoted to the major leagues for the first time. He made his debut the next day, pitching a scoreless inning of relief. In the game, he notched his first MLB strikeout, punching out Arizona Diamondbacks outfielder Tim Locastro. He did not allow an earned run until his 22nd appearance in the majors. He finished his rookie campaign with a 3–2 record and 2.79 ERA with 71 strikeouts across 60 appearances.

In 2022, Bender pitched in 22 games for Miami, recording a 1–3 record and 3.26 ERA with 17 strikeouts and 6 saves in 19.1 innings of work. He was placed on the injured list in August with a right elbow strain. On August 30, 2022, Bender underwent Tommy John surgery, ending his 2022 season and 2023 seasons.

References

External links

1995 births
Living people
Arizona League Royals players
Baseball players from California
Biloxi Shuckers players
Carolina Mudcats players
Lexington Legends players
Major League Baseball pitchers
Miami Marlins players
Milwaukee Milkmen players
People from Petaluma, California
Santa Rosa Bear Cubs baseball players
Sioux City Explorers players
Wilmington Blue Rocks players
Wisconsin Timber Rattlers players